Odweyne (meaning "Big bush") is a town in the northwestern Togdheer region of Somaliland.  It is located between Burco and Hargeisa in the western part of Togdheer region.

Notable residents
Sultan Nur Ahmed Aman, Sultan of the Habr Yunis and one of the founders of the Somali Dervish movement.
Mohamed Haji Ibrahim Egal, two-time prime minister of Somalia and second president of Somaliland.

See also

References

Populated places in Togdheer